Gold(I) chloride is a compound of gold and chlorine with the chemical formula AuCl.

Preparation
Gold(I) chloride is prepared by thermal decomposition of gold(III) chloride.

Reactions
Although there is a region of stability at higher temperatures at the appropriate chlorine vapor pressures, the compound is metastable at ambient conditions. When heated with water, the compound disporpotionates to metallic gold and gold(III) chloride in an autoredox reaction:
 3 AuCl → 2 Au + AuCl3
At still higher temperatures, around 500 °C, all gold chlorides convert to gold.  This conversion is key to the Miller process, which is widely used for the purification of gold.  

Reaction with potassium bromide yields potassium auric bromide and potassium chloride with separation of metallic gold:
 3 AuCl + 4 KBr → KAuBr4 + 2 Au + 3 KCl

Safety
Gold(I) chloride may irritate the skin and eyes, damage kidney function, and reduce white blood cell counts.

References

Gold(I) compounds
Chlorides
Metal halides
Gold–halogen compounds